A dry punch is meteorological slang for a synoptic scale or mesoscale process. A dry punch at the surface results in a dry line bulge. A dry punch aloft above an area of warm, moist (buoyant) air at low levels often increases the potential for severe thunderstorms.

See also
 Dew point depression

Storm